Gordon Marsden (born 28 November 1953) is a British Labour Party politician who served as the Member of Parliament for Blackpool South from 1997 to 2019.

Early life
Marsden was educated at Stockport Grammar School, an independent school in Stockport, Cheshire, followed by New College, Oxford where he attained a first-class degree in Modern History. He then went on to postgraduate studies at the Warburg Institute (part of the University of London) and Harvard Kennedy School, being a Kennedy Scholar in Politics and International Relations.

Before entering Parliament he had been a tutor for the Open University since 1994, as well as a public affairs adviser to English Heritage and, for twelve years, the editor of History Today and New Socialist magazine.

Parliamentary career
Marsden first contested the seat of Blackpool South in 1992 and won it in 1997. Once elected to Parliament, Gordon served as Parliamentary Private Secretary to Lord Irvine of Lairg in the Lord Chancellor's Department (2001–03), Tessa Jowell as Secretary of State for Culture, Media and Sport (2003–05) and John Denham as Secretary of State for Communities and Local Government and shadow communities secretary (2009–10).

In 2003, he was made a Visiting Parliamentary Fellow of St Antony's College, Oxford.

He sat as a member of the House of Commons Innovation, Universities, Science and Skills Committee and Education and Skills Select Committee, before it was dissolved in 2007.

In May 2010, Marsden was given his first shadow ministerial brief, by acting leader Harriet Harman, as Shadow Minister for Further Education, Skills and Regional Growth. He remained in post following Ed Miliband's election as Labour leader, but was appointed as a Shadow Minister for Transport in the October 2013 Labour frontbench reshuffle.

Gordon Marsden was one of 36 Labour MPs to nominate Jeremy Corbyn as a candidate in the Labour leadership election of 2015.

Following Jeremy Corbyn's election as Labour leader in September 2015, Marsden readopted his former Further Education and Skills briefs as Shadow Minister for Higher Education, Further Education and Skills. In his new position, he succeeded Shadow Universities Minister Liam Byrne and Shadow Further Education and Skills Minister Yvonne Fovargue.

He was Chair of the Associate Parliamentary Skills Group and of the All-Party Parliamentary Group for Veterans.

Fabian Society
Marsden is a member of the Fabian Society, of which he was the Chair from 2000 to 2001. He also served as Chair of the Young Fabians and now serves as a Trustee of Dartmouth Street, the building where the Society is based.

Seaside towns
Marsden convened the first group of Labour MPs representing seaside and coastal towns. In 2007 Gordon was asked to chair a Manifesto Group for the Prime Minister Gordon Brown on Seaside and Coastal Towns.

Personal life

Marsden is gay. In early 2009, Gordon was named as one of the Daily Telegraph's expenses "saints", due to the low levels of his expenses claims.

References

External links
 Gordon Marsden MP Homepage

 BBC Politics page

Video clips
 

1953 births
Living people
Labour Party (UK) MPs for English constituencies
Gay politicians
People educated at Stockport Grammar School
Alumni of New College, Oxford
Alumni of the Warburg Institute
Fellows of St Antony's College, Oxford
Academics of the Open University
UK MPs 1997–2001
UK MPs 2001–2005
UK MPs 2005–2010
UK MPs 2010–2015
UK MPs 2015–2017
UK MPs 2017–2019
Chairs of the Fabian Society
LGBT members of the Parliament of the United Kingdom
English LGBT politicians
Politicians from Manchester
Harvard Kennedy School alumni
Kennedy Scholarships
History Today people